Leopold Loeske (24 October 1865, Hohensalza – 29 March 1935, Bad Harzburg) was a German watchmaker and amateur bryologist.

A skilled watchmaker, he was self-taught as a bryologist, collecting moss specimens in Germany, Switzerland and the French Alps during his career. Following World War I, he spent eight years working as a correspondent for a commercial institution due to financial struggles. He joined the British Bryological Society in 1934.

He died at Bad Harzburg while on a collection excursion in the Harz Mountains.

The moss genera Loeskeobryum (M.Fleisch. ex Broth. 1925) and Loeskypnum (H.K.G.Paul, 1916) are both named in his honor.

Published works 
He was the author of 70 published works, including a highly regarded monograph on European Grimmiaceae, "Monographie der europäischen Grimmiaceen" (1930). Other books by Loeske include:
 Moosflora des Harzes, 1903 - Mosses of the Harz.
 Studien zur vergleichenden morphologie und phylogonetischen systematik der laubmoose. 1910 - Studies involving comparative morphology and phylogenetic systematics of mosses.
 Die Laubmoose Europas. I, Grimmiaceae, 1913 - Mosses of Europe, Grimmiaceae. 
 Die Laubmoose Europas. II, Funariaceae, 1914 - Mosses of Europe, Funariaceae.

Loeske was editor of the bryological journal, Bryologische Zeitschrift.

See also 
 Grimmia

References 

1865 births
1935 deaths
Bryologists
20th-century German botanists
People from Inowrocław
People from the Province of Posen
19th-century German botanists